Revelation Part 1: The Root of Life is the second studio album of Stephen Marley, released on 24 May 2011. The album won a Grammy Award in 2012 for Best Reggae Album.

Reception
The album debuted at No. 92 on Billboard 200, and No. 1 on Reggae Albums, selling around 5,000 in the first week. The album has sold 46,000 copies in the United States as of June 2016.

Track listing 
 "Made In Africa" (featuring Wale & The Cast of Fela!)
 "False Friends"
 "Break Us Apart" (featuring Capleton)
 "Can't Keep I Down"
 "No Cigarette Smoking" (featuring Melanie Fiona)
 "Freedom Time"
 "Jah Army" (featuring Damian Marley & Buju Banton)
 "Old Slaves"
 "Pale Moonlight (How Many Times)"
 "She Knows Now"
 "Selassie Is The Chapel" (featuring Ziggy Marley)
 "Tight Ship" (featuring Damian Marley)
 "Working Ways" (featuring Spragga Benz)
 "Now I Know"

Charts

References

2011 albums
Stephen Marley albums
Tuff Gong albums
Universal Records albums